Medalion Rahimi (born July 15, 1992) is an American actress of Iranian descent. She is known for playing Princess Isabella on the 2017 ABC Shonda Rhimes show Still Star-Crossed, and Elody in the 2017 feature film Before I Fall. In 2014 and 2018 she had guest appearances on the CBS crime dramas NCIS and its spinoff NCIS: New Orleans. In 2019, she played the recurring role of Special Agent Fatima Namazi in the franchise's other spinoff, NCIS: Los Angeles. In February 2020, it was announced that she would be a regular on the show.

Filmography

References

External links

1992 births
Living people
Actresses from Los Angeles
American television actresses
American people of Iranian descent
21st-century American actresses